The Church of Living Water is an Evangelical Christian church in Istanbul, Turkey.
The building lies in the Istanbul district of Osmanbey, in the neighborhood of Pangalti, along Ergenekon Caddesi.

External links
Dirisu Kilisesi

Churches in Istanbul
Şişli